The Renault Express is a panel van of the French automobile manufacturer Renault, which in July 1985 succeeded the R4 Fourgonette in the market. It was based on the second generation Renault 5. 

It was commercialised in some European countries as the Renault Extra (United Kingdom and Ireland), Renault Rapid (mainly German-speaking countries) or Renault Express (in France, Spain, Austria, Switzerland, Italy, Japan, Taiwan). From 1996 to 2002, the Express was produced for South America at Nordex in Uruguay.

Structure 

Technically, the Express was based on the second generation of the Renault 5 to which it is identical, except for a few stylistic changes, back to the A-pillar. It also uses the shorter front doors of the 5-door car.

Special features of the Express compared to the Renault 5 were the lengthened wheelbase by about 15cm, the raised roof over the driver's cab and the box structure behind the B-pillar. The vehicle came as a non or partially glazed panel van version with up to two seats, as a glazed combi with five seats.  Rear access was double doors in the rear (with or without 'giraffe hatch' above for long items), or with a large, upward opening tailgate.  The Express was also supplied as pickup, as standard factory  wheelchair vans or with various special bodies (refrigerated trucks, workshop vehicles available, etcetera).

As with its predecessors, the Renault 4 F4 and F6, all wheels were individually suspended: The front by MacPherson struts and wishbones and the rear by trailing arms with torsion bars.  Most similar vehicles, such as the Volkswagen Caddy or Opel Combo and others had a rear dead axle with leaf springs. Ford bought in the Renault Express rear suspension for their 1990s Fiesta Courier.

Model series 
Two facelifts was carried out during the vehicle's production run.

The first version (Phase 1) was built from the middle of 1985 until the summer of 1991. Renault first offered a panel van with a 1595cc diesel engine (40 kW/54 hp), while the petrol engines came from the Renault 5.

In the summer of 1991, a revision was carried out for Phase 2. The engine range changed, because now partially machines from the Renault Clio were used. Added to this was, among other things, a 1870cc diesel engine with 47 kW (64 hp). Also added was a modernised radiator grille, which was moulded in grey plastic. New headlamps were also added to this phase.

The Phase 3 of the model was from the beginning of 1994 until its replacement, the Kangoo, was launched in the end of 1997. The biggest differentiators were looking high quality materials, the radiator grille in body colour and the slightly revised tail lights. A driver's airbag was added as an optional extra. Not only was the safety equipment upgraded, the comfort features, such as central locking with remote control, were updated as well. The 1598cc diesel engine was dropped; in favour of an updated 1870cc engine. Production ended in July 2000.

Engine

External links 

Express
Vans
Vehicles introduced in 1985